The Boeing School of Aeronautics was started by Boeing to compete against the Wright brothers' Wright Flying School and Curtiss Flying School in San Diego, California. Founded in 1929 at Oakland Municipal Airport in Oakland, California, the school started with a staff of 19 and 100 students. It was licensed by the Aeronautical Chamber of Commerce, which licensed aviation schools in that time period.

By 1937, the school had expanded operations to 41 staff and 500 students. In October 1938, General Arnold brought in the top three aviation school representatives to request they establish an unfunded startup of Civilian Pilot Training Program schools at their own risk. These were Oliver Parks of Parks Air College, C. C. Moseley of the Curtiss-Wright Technical Institute, and Theophilus Lee, Jr., of the Boeing School of Aeronautics; all agreed to start work. This expanded in 1940 to include training of 5000 U.S. Army Mechanics. The school expanded to 14 buildings and 1000 students at its peak in 1942. Commercial pilot training was suspended to customer United Airlines to meet wartime demand in August that year. By 1943, the CPTP contract had expired and Boeing absorbed the school operations into the parent company. The facilities remained under the new name United Air Lines Training Center which continued to train mechanics under a Navy contract until 1945, before closing.

The school operated early Boeing aircraft. These included the Boeing Model 81 and Model 100 pursuit fighter in 1928 and the Boeing Model 203 in 1929. Students would help design, develop, test fly and maintain Boeing aircraft, providing the parent company sales and engineering feedback. Several original aircraft were designed by students and teachers, such as the 1939 Thorp T-5, and T-6.

The Oakland Aviation Museum is based at the former Boeing building.

Notable students
Peter M. Bowers (1918–2003) Aeronautical engineer with Boeing and aviation writer.
 Frederick Howard Buller (1914–1994) 1937
 Jack Eckerd
 Ted R. Smith (1906–1976) in 1929.
 John Thorp (1912–1992) student and later teacher.
 Lee Ya-Ching (1912–1998) First Chinese woman to be granted a civil aviation licence in Geneva, Switzerland in 1934, first woman graduated at Boeing School of Aeronautics (USA) in 1935, first Chinese woman to be granted a civil aviation licence in China in 1936.
 Ed Yost (1919–2007) graduated 1939. Father of the modern hot-air balloon.

References

Aviation history of the United States
Aviation schools in the United States
Boeing
Companies based in California
Educational institutions established in 1929
1929 establishments in California